Jana Salat (born April 6, 1979 in Košice) is a Canadian water polo player, who was born in Slovakia. She was part of the 5th place women's water polo team at the 2000 Summer Olympics and a member of the bronze medal winning Canada women's national water polo team at the 2001 World Championships in Fukuoka, Japan.

See also
 Canada women's Olympic water polo team records and statistics
 List of World Aquatics Championships medalists in water polo

External links
 

1979 births
Living people
Olympic water polo players of Canada
Water polo players at the 2000 Summer Olympics
Water polo players at the 2004 Summer Olympics
Canadian female water polo players
Sportspeople from Košice
World Aquatics Championships medalists in water polo
Pan American Games silver medalists for Canada
Slovak emigrants to Canada
Pan American Games medalists in water polo
Water polo players at the 2003 Pan American Games
Medalists at the 2003 Pan American Games